Dimitrios Giantsis (Greek: Δημήτριος Γιάντσης; born 4 March 1988) is a Greek former professional footballer.

Club career

Iraklis
Giantsis started his career in the academies of the football team of his hometown. In 2003, he was spotted by Iraklis' scouters and he joined the football academy of Iraklis. On 1 July 2006, Giantsis signed a professional contract with Iraklis. He was released by the club in the summer of 2010.

AO Kerkyra
In the summer transfer window Giantsis signed on a free transfer for AO Kerkyra in the Greek Superleague. He debuted for his new club in a 2–1 winning match against powerhouse AEK F.C. for the 1st matchday of the 2010–2011 season of the Greek Superleague.

Akropolis IF
In the summer of 2016, Giantsis signed for third-tier Swedish club Akropolis IF.

International career
Giantsis made 10 appearances for the Greek U-21 team. He debuted in 1–1 draw against the Albanian U-21 team in Ruzhdi Bizhuta Stadium, Elbasan on 20 August 2008.

References

External links
Dimitris Giantsis in the official page of Iraklis Salonica
Dimitris Giantsis' profile in Greece U-21's site

Greek footballers
Greece under-21 international footballers
1988 births
Living people
Iraklis Thessaloniki F.C. players
Akropolis IF players
Super League Greece players
Association football wingers
People from Goumenissa
Footballers from Central Macedonia